JRM may refer to:

Military
 Joint Region Marianas, a combined US military command on Guam
 Martin JRM Mars, a WWII Allied flying boat
 Yugoslav Navy (Jugoslavenska ratna mornarica), a coastal defense force

People
 Jacob Rees-Mogg (born 1969), a British Conservative politician

Other
 Jama'at Raza-e-Mustafa, organisation of Indian Sunni Barelvi Muslims 
 Jewish Resistance Movement, brief alliance of Zionist paramilitary groups 
 JR Motorsports, a NASCAR auto racing team